was a Japanese actor, voice actor and narrator born in Nagoya, Aichi Prefecture, Japan who worked at Aoni Production. On February 6, 2006, at the age of 57, he died from acute heart failure. His final appearance was the Naruto 2006 New Year one-hour special, where he voiced Hoki. Following Totani's death, his ongoing roles were taken up by other voice actors.

Filmography

Anime television
1979
Mobile Suit Gundam (Uragan, Cozun Graham)
1984
Fist of the North Star (Club, Fox, Baron, Jagi, Shikaba, Young Ryuuken, Ren, Han, Zebra)
1987
Dragon Ball (Draculaman)
1990
Dragon Ball Z (Kiwi)
1996
Dragon Ball GT (Don Kiar)

Unknown date
Air (Minagi's father)
The Brave Fighter of Sun Fighbird (Guard Wing and Super Guardion)
Brave Police J-Decker (Kuze)
Mobile Suit Zeta Gundam (Kacricon Cacooler, Gady Kinzei)
Mobile Suit Gundam ZZ (Gottn Goh, August Gidan)
Galaxy Express 999 (Locomotive, others)
Ginga: Nagareboshi Gin (Akatora)
Kikou Kantai Dairugger XV (Teles)
Kinnikuman (Detective Gobugari(Aikawa), Announcer, Pentagon, Big Magnum, Ebio/Tendorn, Eragines, Kakehu, Kappatron, Mr Kamen, others)
Cyborg 009 1979 (Pyunma/008)
Sakigake!! Otokojuku (Umanosuke Gonda, Henshouki)
Samurai Champloo (Shige)
Juushin Liger (Doll Neibee)
Heavy Metal L-Gaim (Hasha Moja, Bara)
Aura Battler Dunbine (Tokamak Rovsky, Dolple Giron)
Saint Seiya (Capricorn Shura, Moses)
Armored Trooper Votoms (Butchintein) 
The Transformers (Motormaster/Menasor)
The Transformers 2010 (Sky Lynx, Strafe, Motormaster/Menasor)
Transformers: Victory (Blacker/Road Caesar)
Transformers: The Headmasters (Skullcruncher, Doublecross)
Transformers: Super-God Masterforce (Blood)
High School! Kimengumi (Yui's Father and Tulip)
Dr. Slump and Arale-chan (Kurikinton Soramame, Police Chief, others)
Tatakae!! Ramenman (Jango)
Fullmetal Alchemist (Tim Marcoh)
Mashin Eiyuuden Wataru (Don Goro Shougun, Niō aniyan)
Madö King Granzört (Battoban, Gari ̄ ben)
Marmalade Boy (Yoshimitsu Miwa)
Naruto (Hoki)
Gyandura Densetsu Tetsuya (Zenichi Innami)

OVA
Mobile Suit Gundam 0083: Stardust Memory (1991) (Alpha A. Bate)
Grappler Baki: The Ultimate Fighter (1994) (Atsushi Suedo)

Unknown date
Mobile Suit Gundam 0080: War in the Pocket (Colonel Killing)
Guyver (Gregole)
Legend of the Galactic Heroes (Arthur von Streit)
Dominion (Mohican)

Anime Movie
Transformers: Scramble City (1986) (Motormaster, Menasor)
Mobile Suit Gundam: Char's Counterattack (1988) (Tooth)
3×3 Eyes (1991-1992) (Ryouko)
Fatal Fury: The Motion Picture (1994) (Laurence Blood)

Unknown date
Royal Space Force: The Wings of Honneamise (Charichanmi)
Kinnikuman (series) (Detective Gobugari, Announcer)
Mobile Suit Gundam (Crown)
Mobile Suit Gundam II (Koka Lasa)
Mobile Suit Gundam III (Tokwan)
Mobile Suit Gundam 0083: Last Blitz of Zeon (Alpha A. Bate)
Mobile Suit Zeta Gundam (Kacricon Cacooler)
Mobile Suit Zeta Gundam III (Guwadan Captain, Gady Kinzei)
Legend of the Galactic Heroes (Ernest Mecklinger)
Dragon Ball: Legend of Shenron (Soldier)
Dragon Ball Z (Ginger)
Dragon Ball Z: Super Saiyan Son Goku (Zeeun)

Games
Strider Hiryu (1994 PC-Engine version) (Grandmaster Meio)
Tobal 2 (1997) (Oliems)
Metal Gear Solid (1998) (Revolver Ocelot)
Dead or Alive 2 (1999) (Leon)
Metal Gear Solid 2: Sons of Liberty (2001) (Revolver Ocelot)
Dead or Alive 3 (2002) (Leon)
Ninja Gaiden (2004) (Doku)
Dead or Alive 4 (2005) (Leon)
Persona 3 (2006) (Takeharu Kirijo) (replaced by Yasunori Masutani in subsequent games and anime film adaptations)

BS Dragon Quest (Roujin)
BS Fire Emblem: Akaneia Senki (Narration, King Akaneia, Ruben Hoka)Hokuto no Ken (Arcade) (Jagi)Kinnikuman Generations/Kinnikuman Muscle Generations (Pentagon, Canadianman)Kinnikuman Muscle Grand Prix Max (Pentagon, Announcer) posthumous workKinnikuman Muscle Grand Prix Max 2 (Pentagon) Super Robot Wars (Alpha A. Bate, Cozun Graham, Kacricon Cacooler, Gady Kinzei, Gottn Goh, August Gidan, Netto, Hasha Moja)

TokusatsuMirai Sentai Timeranger (Corrupted Financier Dogoal)

Dubbing RolesA Bridge Too Far (Ludwig (Hardy Kruger))Con Air (Johnny "Johnny 23" Baca (Danny Trejo))Die Hard (Tony (Andreas Wisniewski)Dragonheart (Draco)ER (Officer Reggie Moore (Cress Williams))The Godfather (Fabrizio (Angelo Infanti))Highlander II: The Quickening (Corda (Pete Antico))Marked for Death (Jimmy Fingers (Tony DeBenedetto))The Mask (Dorian Tyrell (Peter Greene))The Mummy (Dr. Bey (Erick Avari))Red Heat (Yuri Ogarkov (Oleg Vidov))The Running Man (Fireball (Jim Brown))Scarface (Omar Suarez (F. Murray Abraham))Star Wars (Daine Jir (Al Lampert))Team America: World Police'' (Helen Hunt)

References

External links
Official agency profile 

1948 births
2006 deaths
Japanese male video game actors
Japanese male voice actors
Male voice actors from Nagoya
Tokai University alumni
Aoni Production voice actors